The 1966 St. Louis Cardinals season was the team's 85th season in St. Louis, Missouri and its 75th season in the National League. The Cardinals went 83–79 during the season and finished sixth in the National League, 12 games behind the Los Angeles Dodgers.

Offseason 
 October 20, 1965: Ken Boyer was traded by the Cardinals to the New York Mets for Charley Smith and Al Jackson.
 October 27, 1965: Dick Groat, Bob Uecker and Bill White were traded by the Cardinals to the Philadelphia Phillies for Pat Corrales, Art Mahaffey, and Alex Johnson.
 November 29, 1965: Nate Colbert was drafted from the Cardinals by the Houston Astros in the 1965 rule 5 draft.
 November 29, 1965: 1965 first-year draft
Jimy Williams was drafted by the Cardinals from the Boston Red Sox.
Willie Montañez was drafted from the Cardinals by the California Angels.

Regular season 
This season marked the final time the Cardinals played in Sportsman's Park/Busch Stadium I, as they played their final home game at that ballpark on May 8, losing to the San Francisco Giants, 10–5.  Busch sought to replace the increasingly inadequate Busch Stadium (formerly Sportsman's Park) with a modern facility in a better location.  The result was a new multi-purpose, $25 million concrete stadium, also named for Busch's father – Busch Memorial Stadium, also known as Busch II.

The Cardinals moved into Busch II four days later, and defeated the Atlanta Braves, 4–3 in 12 innings.  On July 12, the Cardinals hosted the 1966 Major League Baseball All-Star Game at their new stadium, in 105 degree heat and humidity, with the NL defeating the AL, 2–1 in ten innings.  Busch Memorial Stadium was where the Cardinals would play baseball until the end of 2005.

Later derided as a facsimile of the bland, cookie-cutter "multi-purpose stadia" built in multiple locations of the United States during the 1960s and 1970s, Busch Memorial achieved a measure of popularity among St. Louis fans in a way that its cousins in Philadelphia, Atlanta, Pittsburgh, and Cincinnati did not, perhaps due in part to the success of the teams which played there, and perhaps also due to the distinctive roof arches added by architect Edward Durrell Stone — unique touches meant to echo the city's new iconic monument (completed at nearly the same time), the Gateway Arch.

Pitcher Bob Gibson and outfielder Curt Flood won Gold Gloves this year.

Season standings

Record vs. opponents

Notable transactions 
 May 5, 1966: Willie Montañez was returned to the Cardinals by the California Angels.
 May 8, 1966: Ray Sadecki was traded by the Cardinals to the San Francisco Giants for Orlando Cepeda.

Roster

Player stats

Batting

Starters by position 
Note: Pos = Position; G = Games played; AB = At bats; H = Hits; Avg. = Batting average; HR = Home runs; RBI = Runs batted in

Other batters 
Note: G = Games played; AB = At bats; H = Hits; Avg. = Batting average; HR = Home runs; RBI = Runs batted in

Pitching

Starting pitchers 
Note: G = Games pitched; IP = Innings pitched; W = Wins; L = Losses; ERA = Earned run average; SO = Strikeouts

Other pitchers 
Note: G = Games pitched; IP = Innings pitched; W = Wins; L = Losses; ERA = Earned run average; SO = Strikeouts

Relief pitchers 
Note: G = Games pitched; W = Wins; L = Losses; SV = Saves; ERA = Earned run average; SO = Strikeouts

Awards and records 
Tim McCarver, National League leader, Triples, (13). McCarver became the second catcher in the history of the National League to lead the league in triples.

Farm system 

Eugene affiliation shared with Philadelphia Phillies

References

External links
1966 St. Louis Cardinals at Baseball Reference
1966 St. Louis Cardinals team page at www.baseball-almanac.com

St. Louis Cardinals seasons
Saint Louis Cardinals season
St. Louis Cardinals